Route 114 is a  Massachusetts state route that, while essentially a northwest–southeast route, is signed west–east. It runs from Route 28 in Lawrence to its terminus at Route 129 in Marblehead. The route is entirely located in Essex County.

Route description

Route 114 begins in Lawrence at Route 28, at the southern end of the O'Leary Bridge.  It heads eastward along Merrimack Street before turning southward onto Parker Street, passing Lawrence Station as it does.  It then bends southeastward at Andover Street, intersecting I-495 at Exit 100 (formerly 42).  It then crosses the Shawsheen River into North Andover, becoming the Salem Turnpike.  In North Andover, Route 114 crosses Route 133 before beginning a concurrency with Route 125 which lasts for over half a mile, passing through the Merrimack College campus in the process.  It then continues through the town into Middleton, where it has a short wrong-way concurrency with Route 62 in the center of town.

From Middleton, Route 114 heads into Danvers.  In Danvers, Route 114 has interchanges with U.S. Route 1 and I-95 in quick succession before entering into Peabody.  In Peabody, Route 114 passes the Northshore Mall just before meeting Route 128 at Exit 40 (formerly 25).  It continues through the northeastern part of town, meeting the southern end of Route 35 before passing into Salem.

In Salem, Route 114 crosses over Route 107 adjacent to the Salem Station.  It then continues along North Street, which turns into Summer Street before the route turns eastward onto Norman Street.  It then turns south onto Lafayette Street, becoming concurrent with Route 1A southward, until the two split in front of Salem State University, with Route 114 continuing southward, crossing the Forest River into Marblehead.  The route finally ends at the intersection of Pleasant Street and Ocean Avenue, where it meets the eastern end of Route 129, at Marblehead's main fire station.

History
Route 114 was originally the Essex Turnpike.

For about its first three decades as 114, Route 114 originally went only as far as Salem.  The route was extended to Marblehead in the late 1950s.

Between 1997 and 2002, the terminations of Routes 114 and 129 in Marblehead were extended by slightly more than half a mile eastward, to meet at Essex and Pleasant Streets. After 2002, the roads reverted to their prior forms.

Major intersections

See also

References

External links

114
Transportation in Essex County, Massachusetts